Bagusa is a Papuan language of Indonesia.

References

Languages of western New Guinea
Kwerba languages